The Chicago and North Western Passenger Depot is a historic building located in Wall Lake, Iowa, United States. Wall Lake was served by both the Chicago & North Western Railroad and the Illinois Central Railroad, which gave it a significant rail presence from the 1880s until World War II. The C&NW depot is an example of a combination station plan. The plan combined both passenger and freight services in one building. They were commonly used during the heyday of railroad growth round the turn of the 20th century. However, the old Wall Lake C&NW depot was moved and used for freight. What would have been the freight room was used here for a lunchroom. C&NW had three standard combination depot plans that have been attributed to the prominent Chicago architectural firm of Frost & Granger. The Wall Lake depot was the largest of the three as it incorporated a women's waiting room, but it was actually  shorter than the general plan because freight was processed in another facility. The depot was built in 1899 by A.H. Carter & Co. of Cedar Rapids, Iowa as a replacement depot. The single-story frame structure is the only building used as a depot that remains in town. It was listed on the National Register of Historic Places in 2003.

References

Railway stations in the United States opened in 1899
Walls Lake
Walls Lake
Transportation buildings and structures in Sac County, Iowa
Railway stations on the National Register of Historic Places in Iowa
Former railway stations in Iowa
National Register of Historic Places in Sac County, Iowa